Passiflora maliformis, the sweet calabash, conch apple, wild purple passionfruit, or sweet cup, is a smallish passionfruit with purple, yellow or green skin and a greyed-yellow to orange pulp that is aromatically scented and flavoured. It is a fast-growing vine, growing best in somewhat cooler-than-tropical climates. The rind is particularly hard and tougher than most passionfruits. It is usually eaten fresh or used to flavour drinks. It is a native to the Caribbean, Central America and Northern South America.

Description

Passiflora maliformis is a fast-growing evergreen shrub or vine. The skin of this fruit can be hard so a hammer is sometimes needed to open it for consumption.

Cultivation

It is usually grown from seeds but may also be propagated by stem-cuttings and layering. Grafting onto other Passiflora rootstock can improve hardiness. Passiflora maliformis grows in the warm, wet tropics the plants require a temperature no lower than around  when they are flowering in order to ensure fruit set. Passiflora species tend to flower and fruit more freely when grown in soils of only moderate fertility. Seedlings can commence fruiting when only 1–2 years old. Plants in this genus are notably resistant to honey fungus.

Nutrition
Passiflora maliformis arils contain 85.44% water, 7.17% net carbohydrates, 3.63% fibre, 2.2% protein, and 0.45% fat (see table). A  amount provides  and is an excellent source of magnesium and phosphorus as well as a significant source of other minerals (see table). The fruit also contains various organic acids and phenolic compounds which are responsible for the aroma and flavour. It is commonly eaten raw or made into a drink, it is said to have a flavor similar to grape.

References

maliformis
Plants described in 1753
Taxa named by Carl Linnaeus